is a Japanese dark fantasy anime television series, adapted from the manga series of the same name by Hajime Isayama, that premiered on April 7, 2013. It has aired on NHK General TV in Japan, and Aniplus Asia in various Asia-Pacific countries. In the United States and Canada, the series has been streamed on Crunchyroll, Funimation, Netflix, Amazon Prime Video, and Hulu. Attack on Titan has also aired on  Adult Swim's Toonami programming block in the U.S.

Set in a post-apocalyptic world where the remains of humanity live behind walls protecting them from giant humanoid Titans, Attack on Titan follows protagonist Eren Yeager, along with friends Mikasa Ackerman and Armin Arlert. When a Colossal Titan breaches the wall of their hometown, Titans destroy the city and eat Eren's mother. Vowing vengeance, Eren joins the elite Survey Corps, a group of soldiers who fight against Titans. It chronicles Eren's journey with the Survey Corps as they fight against the Titans while investigating their origin and history.

Since its debut in 2013, Attack on Titan has received widespread critical acclaim and multiple accolades. Critics and audiences have praised the show for its story line, animation, action sequences, characters, voice acting (both original and dubbed), soundtrack, and dark themes.

Series overview

Season 1

In the first season, the protagonist, Eren Yeager, witnesses his mother dying after being eaten by man-eating giant humanoid creatures called Titans. This becomes Eren's motivation to develop his combat skills in order to fight the Titans. Later on, Eren is eaten by a Titan himself but discovers that he can transform into a Titan, control it, and fight like he would as a human. Eren learns how to use his newfound powers to combat the Titans and continues his training as more titans continue to flood into his homeland.

Season 2

In its second season, the main cast of characters, who have joined the Survey Corps, are thrown into action after Titans breach the walls without any apparent trace of how they entered. Along the way, they discover the true nature of the Titans.

Season 3

In its two-part third season, the Survey Corps are hunted as Eren and another member are wanted. Later, they defend their hometown in a series of battles against the strongest Titans. Afterwards, reeling from the devastating battles, the Survey Corps members uncover the truth about their world and humanity in general.

Season 4

Its fourth season, split into three parts, takes place four years after Eren and his compatriots learn the truth about their situation. A new cast of characters, part of the enemy's elite Warrior Unit, battles against the Survey Corps as each side seeks to protect their home and ideals. At the same time, Eren concocts a devastating plan to take care of his homeland's enemies.

Cast and characters
 Yuki Kaji (Japanese) / Bryce Papenbrook (English) as Eren Yeager
 Yui Ishikawa (Japanese)  / Trina Nishimura (English) as Mikasa Ackerman
 Marina Inoue (Japanese) / Josh Grelle (English) as Armin Arlert
 Yoshimasa Hosoya (Japanese) / Robert McCollum (English) as Reiner Braun
 Hiroshi Kamiya (Japanese) / Matthew Mercer (English) as Levi Ackerman
 Romi Park (Japanese) / Jessica Calvello (English) as Hange Zoë
 Kishô Taniyama (Japanese) / Mike McFarland (English) as Jean Kirstein
 Hiro Shimono (Japanese) / Clifford Chapin (English) as Connie Springer
 Yū Kobayashi (Japanese) / Ashly Burch (Season 1-3) and Megan Shipman (Season 4) (English) as Sasha Braus
 Daisuke Ono (Japanese) / J. Michael Tatum (English) (season 1-3; guest: season 4) as Erwin Smith 
 Yū Shimamura (Japanese) / Lauren Landa (English) (season 1 and 4; guest: season 2-3) as Annie Leonhart
 Keiji Fujiwara (season 1) and Kenjiro Tsuda (season 2; guest: season 3) (Japanese) / David Wald (season 1-2; guest: season 3) (English) as Hannes 
 Tomohisa Hashizume (Japanese) / David Matranga (English) (season 2-3; recurring: season 1) as Bertolt Hoover
 Shiori Mikami (Japanese) / Bryn Apprill (English) (season 2-4; recurring: season 1) as Historia Reiss 
 Yusaku Yara (Japanese) / Kenny Green (English) (season 3; guest: season 4) as Rod Reiss
 Kazuhiro Yamaji (Japanese) / Phil Parsons (English) (season 3; guest: season 4) as Kenny Ackerman
 Takehito Koyasu (Japanese) / Jason Liebrecht (English) (season 4; recurring: season 2-3) as Zeke Yeager
 Ayane Sakura (Japanese) / Lindsay Seidel (English) (season 4) as Gabi Braun
 Natsuki Hanae (Japanese) / Bryson Baugus (English) (season 4) as Falco Grice
 Manami Numakura (Japanese) / Amber Lee Connors (English) (season 4) as Pieck Finger
 Toshiki Masuda (Japanese) / Kellen Goff (English) (season 4) as Porco Galliard
 Jiro Saito (Japanese) / Neil Kaplan (English) (season 4) as Theo Magath
 Masaya Matsukaze (Japanese) / Griffin Burns (English) (season 4) as Colt Grice
 Kensho Ono (Japanese) / Matt Shipman (English) (season 4; recurring: season 3) as Floch Forster
 Mitsuki Saiga (Japanese) / Anairis Quiñones (English) (season 4) as Yelena
 Kouji Hiwatari (Japanese) / Zeno Robinson (English) (season 4) as Onyankopon

Production

Season 1 and compilation films

Produced by IG Port's Wit Studio and directed by Tetsurō Araki, Attack on Titan was broadcast on MBS TV from April 7, 2013 to September 29, 2013, and later aired on Tokyo MX, FBS, TOS, HTB, TV Aichi and BS11. The anime had some production issues with needing more animators with Wit Studios' character designer, Kyoji Asano tweeting and looking for active animators to work on the anime.

Both Funimation and Crunchyroll have streamed the series with subtitles on their respective websites. Funimation has also licensed the anime for home video release in 2014. Episode 1 of the English version premiered at Anime Boston, with other episodes put on Funimation's subscription services. On television of the series has broadcast weekly on Adult Swim's Toonami block on May 3, 2014, starting at 11:30 p.m. EST. In Australia, the anime aired on SBS 2 on Tuesdays, in Japanese with English subtitles, with the first episode having aired on September 30. The first season was acquired for distribution in the UK by Manga Entertainment. Madman Entertainment acquired the show for distribution in Australia and New Zealand, and streamed the series on Madman Screening Room.

The final episode was also aired in Japanese theaters. The anime was compiled into two animated theatrical films with new voice acting from the same cast. The first film  covers the first 13 episodes and was released on November 22, 2014, while the second film  adapts the remaining episodes and adds new opening and ending footage. It was released on June 27, 2015. A rebroadcast of the first season was aired from January 9, 2016 on NHK's BS Premium channel. The compilation films were also broadcast in January 2017 on MBS.

Season 2 and compilation film

A second season of the anime series was announced on the opening day of the first theatrical film, which was originally set to be released in 2016. It was then confirmed in the January 2017 issue of the Bessatsu Shōnen Magazine that the second season would premiere in April 2017. Masashi Koizuka directed the second season, with Araki acting as chief director. It ran for 12 episodes from April 1, 2017, to June 17, 2017, on MBS and other television networks. A third compilation film recapping the events of the anime series' second season titled  was released on January 13, 2018.

The season premiere was simulcast on Funimation, Crunchyroll, and the former's VRV channel at 10:30 AM EST. Funimation and Crunchyroll streamed the entire second season on their respective websites, while Adult Swim's Toonami aired a dubbed version. It was also announced that the second season of Attack on Titan would premiere on Toonami on April 29. It was subsequently announced on April 3 that the second season would premiere one week earlier, on April 22 instead. Madman Entertainment streamed the season in Australia and New Zealand on AnimeLab.  Season 2 home media release was handled by Sony Pictures in the UK.

Season 3 and compilation film

On June 17, 2017, a third season was announced at the close of the second season's final episode, with a release date slated for July 23, 2018. A trailer for the third season was released on April 27, 2018. The series' third season aired in Japan on NHK General TV on July 23, 2018, with its first part running to October 15, 2018. Part 2 of the series' third season aired from April 29 to July 1, 2019. Hajime Isayama, the original manga's author and illustrator, works closely with the animators to ensure faithfulness to the story and gives suggestions, as well. In 2018, it was revealed that Isayama regretted doing a certain part of the manga in a certain way, so he personally requested the animation studio to make some changes in the anime. The studio honored this wish, resulting in the first part of Season 3 being a little different from the corresponding manga chapters. A fourth compilation film, recaps all three seasons and was released on July 17, 2020.

Funimation announced that they would air the worldwide premiere of the first episode at Anime Expo on July 8, 2018. They also announced that the first episode would air in theaters in the US and Canada alongside Attack on Titan: Roar of Awakening on July 10, 2018. Adult Swim aired the English version of the third season, starting from August 18, 2018 to July 27, 2019. On July 4, 2020, Funimation announced that they licensed the compilation film for UK, Ireland, and North America release.

Season 4: The Final Season

Upon the airing of the final episode of the third season on July 1, 2019, it was announced that the fourth and final season of the anime series was scheduled for release in Fall 2020 on NHK General TV. On May 29, 2020, the final season was confirmed to have switched production studios to MAPPA. Yuichiro Hayashi and Jun Shishido replaced Tetsurō Araki and Masashi Koizuka as directors, scriptwriter Hiroshi Seko took over the series composition from Yasuko Kobayashi, and Tomohiro Kishi replaced Kyōji Asano as character designer. Kohta Yamamoto joined Hiroyuki Sawano to compose the music. Netflix Singapore as well as other various Southeast Asian countries announced to start regional streaming from December 10 and 11. On September 23, 2020, NHK listed the final season on their broadcasting schedule as airing on December 7, 2020. The first part, which consists of 16 episodes, aired on NHK General TV until March 29, 2021. The second part, which consists of 12 episodes, aired from January 10 to April 4, 2022 at 12:05 a.m. JST. A third and final part will air in two halves; the first half, a one-hour special, premiered on March 4, 2023, at 12:25 a.m. JST.

Music

First season

Both "Guren no Yumiya" and "Jiyū no Tsubasa" were released as part of the single "Jiyū e no Shingeki" on July 10, 2013, which sold over 100 thousand copies in its first week of sales.

The series' soundtrack was composed by Hiroyuki Sawano, and the first CD was released on June 28, 2013, by Pony Canyon. The first CD contains 16 tracks, including 6 vocal tracks performed by Aimee Blackschleger, CASG (Caramel Apple Sound Gadget), Cyua, Mika Kobayashi and mpi. The second CD containing the other half of the soundtrack was released on October 16, 2013, as a bonus offered with the fourth Blu-ray and DVD limited edition volumes of the anime.

Track listing

Second season

Sawano returned to compose the soundtrack for the second season, with the 2-CD soundtrack released on June 7, 2017, by Pony Canyon. In addition to music composed for Season 2, the soundtrack also featured any and all tracks composed for other media in-between seasons one and two, such as compilation films and OVAs.

Vocals were provided by yosh, Gemie, mpi, Mica Caldito, Mika Kobayashi and Benjamin.

Track listing

Third season

Sawano once again returned as composer. The soundtrack was released on June 26, 2019. As with the second season's soundtrack, music featured in compilation films and OVAs released between season two and three was included in the soundtrack. Vocals were provided by David Whitaker, Eliana, Gemie, Laco, mpi, and yosh.

Track listing

Final season

The score is directed by Masafumi Mima and composed by Hiroyuki Sawano and Kohta Yamamoto.

For Part 1, the opening theme song is  performed by Shinsei Kamattechan, and the ending theme song is  performed by Yūko Andō. For Part 2, the opening theme song is "The Rumbling" performed by SiM, and the ending theme song is  performed by Ai Higuchi. For the first special of Part 3, the ending theme is "Under the Tree" performed by SiM.

The soundtrack was composed by Kohta Yamamoto (on tracks 1–20), and Hiroyuki Sawano (on tracks 21–23), and was released on June 23, 2021 by Pony Canyon. It was released digitally on several sites including Apple Music and Spotify. It contains 23 tracks, with two vocal tracks featuring performances by cumi and Hannah Grace.

Track listing

Anime films
For the first compilation film, "Attack on Titan – Part 1: Crimson Bow and Arrow," the ending themes were "YAMANAIAME" (lit. "Unstoppable Rain") by Hiroyuki Sawano feat. For the second compilation film, "Attack on Titan – Part 2: Wings of Freedom," the ending themes was "theDOGS" by Hiroyuki Sawano feat. mpi.

Reception

Sales and accolades
The anime series has been successful in Japan, with average sales of 52,067 across 9 volumes, with a total of 468,603 . It was the number one selling TV anime of 2013 in Japan and is currently the eighth best selling anime of 2010's. It has also been very successful in the U.S. with sales of at least 200,000. It was also the number one streaming anime from Funimation in 2014 and the number one fan favorite Funimation home video released of 2014.

The anime adaptation won multiple prizes during the 3rd Newtype Anime Awards, including Best Director, Best Script, Best Soundtrack, Best Theme Song, Top Female Character and Title of the Year. It received the award for Best TV Animation at the 2013 Animation Kobe Awards. It received the award for Animation of the Year at the 2014 Tokyo Anime Award, along with, Best Director, Best Screenplay and Best Music. It won the 2013 Digital Contents of the Year Award at Japan's 19th annual Association of Media in Digital (AMD) Awards.

Critical response
Review aggregator Rotten Tomatoes gave the show an overall score of 95%. Carl Kimlinger from Anime News Network described the first two episodes of the anime adaptation, saying, "It's hard to say what kind of show Titan would be without the operatic over-direction of Tetsuro Araki, but with him in charge, it's a clenched fist of a series: always tensed up to strike and prone to bludgeoning us when it does." Other critics from Anime News Network praised much of the series. Rebecca Silverman said it "is both gorgeous and appalling in its visuals," and "an excellent mix of what 18th century Gothic novelist Ann Radcliffe defined as horror versus terror: the one is physical, making you want to look away, and the other is intellectual, making you want to know what's going to happen next." Carlo Santos noted that "few [apocalyptic action shows] get as close to perfection as Attack on Titan does". Santos described it as "a masterpiece of death and destruction" after watching only the first episode. Theron Martin of Anime News Network praised the musical score and the "intense, impactful first episode" despite his feeling that it has "limited animation". Martin also compared Attack on Titan vibe and visual aesthetic to Claymore.

John Sinnott of DVD Talk called the series one of the best ones he has ever watched and one "that anime fans should not miss". Maya Phillips of New York magazine and Vulture praised the uniqueness of the series, stating, "In our current age of terrifying dystopian realities, it's hard to find a dystopian show with something new to deliver - and yet here it is." Phelim O'Neill of The Guardian, he praised the animation of the series as "spellbinding... It's all wonderfully acrobatic and intense". Regarding the climactic episodes of the third season's second half, Manga.Tokyo called Isayama a "genius" for using the revelations about Grisha's past to smoothly link present events to the beginning of the story.

Crunchyroll listed Attack on Titan in their "Top 25 best anime of the 2010s". IGN and Polygon also listed  Attack on Titan among the best anime series of the 2010s. Lauren Orsini of Forbes included Attack on Titan on her list of the best anime of the decade.

Censorship
 : In 2015, the Ministry of Culture of the People's Republic of China forbade distribution of "Attack on Titan," along with 38 other anime and manga titles, which were deemed to feature scenes of violence, pornography, terrorism and crimes against public morality, in an effort to "protect the healthy development of youth".
 : As part of Malaysia's censorship laws, it is required that parts of bodies which are considered indecent be censored. In Attack on Titan, the corpse of the Titan can be seen wearing a bodysuit.
 : In July 2021, the government of the Russian Federation banned the distribution of Attack on Titan among various other titles citing “concern for the welfare of youth.” In the wake of the military invasion of Ukraine by Russia in February 2022, the series distributor Crunchyroll shut down its subsidiaries of Wakanim and Crunchyroll EMEA in the country, due to international sanctions thus preventing Russian viewers from legally streaming Attack on Titan.

Viewership
In 2021, during the first part of the final season, Attack on Titan was the most viewed television program in the United States, before it was overtaken by The Falcon and the Winter Soldier shortly before the mid-season finale. Attack on Titan broke the Guinness World Record for the "most in-demand anime TV show". The show is also the only anime series to be in TV Time'''s top 50 most followed TV series ever, currently at number 47, making it one of the few Non-American titles and the only Japanese title in this list. In 2022 Attack on Titan won the award of "Most in-demand TV series in the world 2021" in the Global TV Demand Awards. Attack on Titan became the first ever non-English language series to earn the title of World’s Most In-Demand TV Show, previously held by only The Walking Dead and Game of Thrones''.

Awards and nominations

See also

 List of Attack on Titan chapters
 List of Attack on Titan novels

Notes

References
 Citations

 Sources

External links

  
  at Adult Swim
 
 
  at Funimation
 Attack on Titan at The Encyclopedia of Science Fiction
 

 
2013 anime television series debuts
2014 anime films
2015 anime films
2017 anime television series debuts
2018 anime television series debuts
Action anime and manga
Anime and manga about revenge
Anime composed by Hiroyuki Sawano
Anime films composed by Hiroyuki Sawano
Anime series based on manga
Censored television series
Censorship in Malaysia
Censorship in Russia
Crunchyroll Anime Awards winners
Dark fantasy anime and manga
Dystopian anime and manga
Funimation
IG Port franchises
Mainichi Broadcasting System original programming
MAPPA
Muse Communication
NHK original programming
Post-apocalyptic anime and manga
Production I.G
Television censorship in China
Television shows written by Yasuko Kobayashi
Toonami
Upcoming anime television series
Wit Studio
Works banned in China
Works banned in Russia